Novaya Zhizn (New Life) was the first legal Bolshevik daily newspaper. It was founded by Alexander Bogdanov and its first editor was Nikolai Minsky. It was first published in October 1905 in Petersburg, under the guidance of Lenin. It was published until December 1905.

The paper was funded by Nikolai Pavlovich Schmidt and Savva Morozov.

See also
Iskra
Novaya Zhizn (Mensheviks), a Menshevik newspaper

References

Communist newspapers
Defunct newspapers published in Russia
Publications with year of establishment missing
Russian-language newspapers